Mehrili (also, Mekhrili, Mekhdili, and Meqirli) is a village in the Qubadli Rayon of Azerbaijan.

Mehrili is Azeri village in Qubadli

References 

Populated places in Qubadli District